Leopold Courvoisier (1873–1955) was a Swiss astronomer. He was born in Riehen, Switzerland, near Basel. He was the chief observer at the observatory in Babelsberg (near Berlin) from 1905 to 1938.

Work

Besides many contributions to observational astronomy, he attempted to detect the absolute motion of the solar system through the ether, using a variety of methods, both astronomical and experimental. However, his work was largely ignored by the scientific community.

Notes and references

19th-century Swiss astronomers
1873 births
1955 deaths
People from Riehen
20th-century Swiss astronomers